Aleksandr Aleksandrovich Novikov (born 12 October 1984) is a former Russian professional football player. He played as a centre back.

External links
 

1984 births
Sportspeople from Omsk
Living people
Russian footballers
Association football midfielders
FC Ural Yekaterinburg players
Russian Premier League players
FC Irtysh Omsk players
FC Yenisey Krasnoyarsk players
FC Sibir Novosibirsk players